In the 2011–12 season, USM Alger competed in the Ligue 1 for the 34th time, as well as the Algerian Cup.  It was their 17th consecutive season in the top flight of Algerian football. USM Alger lost to USM El Harrach 1–4 (P) in the quarterfinals of the Algerian Cup.

Season summary 

In the Summer transfer window USMA made big deals that reached fifteen of the best players including four from ES Setif, The club has also dispensed with two of the oldest players in the club Hocine Achiou and Karim Ghazi after the coach refused to stay. On 28 July, USM Alger signed a contract with American brand Nike for an indefinite period. which has the effect of greatly change the backbone of the team, USM Alger is then quickly dubbed the Dream Team by the Algerian media, particularly the newspapers. In Ligue Professionnelle 1, USM Alger competed for the title until the last round. 

On 14 April, in a match against MC Saïda at Stade 13 Avril 1958 Where did they need victory to stay away from relegation to Ligue Professionnelle 2 and in the last minute Nouri Ouznadji scored the equalizer. after the end of the match, while on their way to the changing rooms USM Alger players were attacked by strangers, the most dangerous of which was the assault that  Abdelkader Laïfaoui was subjected with a knife that almost killed him and due to his injuries he had to receive stitches and spend the night in hospital. then decided USM Alger lifting lawsuit against unknown persons also decided not to play in Saïda for five years. On 12 May, in a match against JSM Béjaïa in Bologhine and after a great drama it ended with a 4–3 victory for JSM Béjaïa which was the reason for losing the title. With the end of the season after six years absence USM Alger returned to the continental competitions from the gate of Confederation Cup.

Squad list
Players and squad numbers last updated on 18 November 2011.Note: Flags indicate national team as has been defined under FIFA eligibility rules. Players may hold more than one non-FIFA nationality.

Pre-season and friendlies

Competitions

Ligue 1

League table

Results summary

Results by round

Matches

Algerian Cup

Squad information

Playing statistics

Appearances (Apps.) numbers are for appearances in competitive games only including sub appearances
Red card numbers denote:   Numbers in parentheses represent red cards overturned for wrongful dismissal.

Goalscorers
Includes all competitive matches. The list is sorted alphabetically by surname when total goals are equal.

Clean sheets 
Includes all competitive matches.

Transfers

In

Out

References

USM Alger seasons
Algerian football clubs 2011–12 season